Lindenwold may refer to:

Lindenwold, New Jersey
Lindenwold High School
Lindenwold Public Schools
Lindenwold station
Lindenwold estate
Lindenwold (Morristown, New Jersey), listed on the NRHP in Morris County, New Jersey